Antigone Kefala (28 May 1931 – 3 December 2022) was an Australian poet and prose-writer of Greek-Romanian heritage. She was a member of the Literature Board of the Australia Council and is acknowledged as being an important voice in capturing the migrant experience in contemporary Australia. In 2017, Kefala was awarded the State Library of Queensland Poetry Collection Judith Wright Calanthe Award at the Queensland Literary Awards for her collection of poems entitled Fragments.

Life 
Born in Brăila, Romania in 1931, Kefala and family moved to Greece and then New Zealand after World War II. Having studied French Literature at Victoria University and obtained a MA, she relocated to Sydney, Australia in 1960. There she taught English as a second language and worked as a university and arts administrator. Her poetry and prose is written in both Greek and English, with Absence: New and Selected Poems reissued in a second edition in 1998.

Her work, written in free verse, has been described as having an almost metaphysical detachment. It is characterised by an austere allusiveness unusual in Australian poetry. Aside from Greek and  English it has been translated into Czech and French.

In 2009, Antigone Kefala: A Writer’s Journey, an anthology of reviews, essays and analytical writing of Kefala's works edited by Professor Vrasidas Karalis and Helen Nickas was published by Owl Publishing. In 2021, a collection of essays on her prose and poetry titled Antigone Kefala: New Australian Modernities, edited by Elizabeth McMahon and Brigitta Olubas, was published by UWA Publishing.

In November 2022, Kefala won the Patrick White Award. A week later, she died on 3 December 2022, at the age of 87.

Works
Poetry
 The Alien (Makar Press: 1973)
 Thirsty Weather (Outback: 1978)
 European Notebook (Hale & Iremonger: 1988)
 Absence: New and selected poems (Sydney, Hale & Iremonger: 1992, 2nd ed. 1998)
 Poems: A selection (Melbourne, Owl Publishing: 2000)
 
Prose fiction
 The First Journey (Wild & Woolley: 1975)
 The Island (Hale & Iremonger: 1984)
 Sunday Morning in The Oxford book of Australian Short Stories selected by Michael Wilding (Melbourne : Oxford University Press: 1994)
 Summer Visit: Three Novellas (Giramondo Publishing: 2003)
 Sydney Journals (Giramondo Publishing: 2008) 
 Max: The Confessions of a Cat (Owl Publishing: 2009)

Awards and recognition
 2017 Queensland Literary Awards – State Library of Queensland Poetry Collection – Judith Wright Calanthe Award for Fragments
 2022 Patrick White Award – winner

References

External links
 Antigone Kefala on Australian Poetry Library
 3 poems with German translations in Gangway #1
 "Journal II" prose poem in Gangway #18
 "Alexia: Antigone Kefala's overdue fairytale" by Michael Tsianikas

1935 births
2022 deaths
Greek emigrants to Australia
Romanian people of Greek descent
Greek emigrants to New Zealand
Modern Greek poets
New Zealand emigrants to Australia
People from Brăila
Greek women writers
Victoria University of Wellington alumni
Australian women poets
20th-century Australian poets
20th-century Australian women writers
Patrick White Award winners